Buraswa is a village which is located 30 km from Chakrata and comes under the Tehsil of Chakrata, Dehradun, Uttarakhand, India.  

The name of this village is derived from the flower burans, which is abundant in this area.  The residents and ruler of this village are Rawat whose ancestors are Ruler of Hansrigarh (Rawat Rajputs) and in history they have close relations with Garhwal Kingdom and Sirmoor State of Himachal Pradesh.  Due to heavy war, the ancestors of Rawat’s of Buraswa migrated to what is presently known as Buraswa on Basant Panchami centuries ago.  

Buraswa has a high literacy rate (85%). This village is famous for its brotherhood and its landholdings because there are only 16–18 families of THAKUR (rajput) who have their own territory known as Khatt khas (Buraswa). Agriculture includes apple orchards, farming, cattle, etc. 

Rural tourism is helping others to come and witness the culture.

References

Villages in Dehradun district